Champa rice is a quick-maturing, drought resistant rice that can allow two harvests of sixty days each per growing season. Champa rice is from the aus sub-population, which shares similarities with both the japonica and the indica rice varieties. Likely originating from Eastern India, champa rice was introduced into the Champa Kingdom from the Vietnamese Empire in the late 10th century. Champa rice was then sent to Song China in the 11th century as a tribute gift from Champa during the reign of Emperor Zhenzong of Song (r. 997–1022). Song dynasty officials gave the quick-growing champa rice to peasants across China in order to boost their crop yields, and its rapid growth time was crucial in feeding the burgeoning Chinese population of over 100 million.

See also 
 List of rice varieties

References

Rice varieties